The 2014 Winter Olympics, officially the XXII Olympic Winter Games, or the 22nd Winter Olympics, took place from 7 to 23 February 2014, in Sochi, Russia. 98 events in 15 winter sport disciplines were held, with gold, silver and bronze medals were awarded in each event. These Games were affected by the Russian doping scandal with 6 of Russia's original 33 medals stripped for doping violations.

{| id="toc" class="toc" summary="Contents"
|align="center" colspan="3"|Contents
|-
|
Alpine skiing
Biathlon
Bobsleigh
Cross-country skiing
Curling
|valign=top|
Figure skating
Freestyle skiing
Ice hockey
Luge
Nordic combined
|valign=top|
Short track speed skating
Skeleton
Ski jumping
Snowboarding
Speed skating
|-
|align=center colspan=3|See also   References
|}


Alpine skiing

Men's events

Two bronze medals, one to Canada and one to United States, were awarded for a third-place tie in the men's super-G event.

Women's events

Two gold medals, one to Slovenia and one to Switzerland, were awarded for a first-place tie in the women's downhill event. No silver medal was awarded.

Biathlon

Men's events

Women's events

Mixed events

Bobsleigh

Cross-country skiing

Men's events

Women's events

Curling

Figure skating

 *Indicates the athlete(s) only competed in the short program/dance.
 **Indicates the athlete(s) only competed in the long program/dance.

Freestyle skiing

Men's events

Women's events

Ice hockey

Luge

Nordic combined

Short track speed skating

Men's events

Women's events

Skeleton

Ski jumping

Snowboarding

Men's events

Women's events

Speed skating

Men's events

Women's events

See also
 2014 Winter Olympics medal table
 List of 2014 Winter Paralympics medal winners

References

External links

Lists of Winter Olympic medalists by year
Russia sport-related lists
 
medal winners
How to Carve on a Longboard?